Liberty Shoes Limited (LSL) is an Indian shoe company, based in Karnal, Haryana.

Established in 1954, the company produces 60,000 pairs of footwear a day through its six manufacturing units. The shoes are sold through multi-brand outlets and exclusive showrooms. The company has a presence in 25 countries, with 50 showrooms outside India. Adesh Gupta became the CEO of LSL on 16 July 2001.

History
Liberty Shoes was founded by Dharam Pal Gupta, Purshotam Das Gupta and Rajkumar Bansal as Pal Boot House in 1954. Liberty Shoes first organized its distribution and exclusive showrooms in 1983, working with Balbir Singh & Sons.

The company was incorporated in September 1986 as a public limited company; it obtained the Certificate of Commencement of Business in March 1988. It also set up a joint venture in Russia to manufacture shoes in 1991, working under the name of M/S Liberty & Go. The company markets its product nationally and internationally under the brand name "LIBERTY."

Force 10, Liberty's first sub-brand, was launched in August 1990, taking advantage of a casual footwear trend sweeping the Indian market. By 1995, Force 10 became Liberty's flagship brand, notching up sales of 32 crore. In the coming years, it not only helped the company establish its name in the domestic footwear market, but also paved the way for nine other sub-brands.

The company saw major expansion in the 2000s in both retail and manufacturing bases. In April 2003, the Liberty Group underwent an important restructuring and its product portfolio was also revamped.

Liberty Group also works with fashion designers such as Rohit Bal, Rajesh Pratap Singh, Rina Dhaka, Rohit Gandhi, Ashish Soni and Suneet Verma to develop footwear matching their clothing lines.

Manufacturing 

Liberty's manufacturing base includes six facilities spread across multiple states, two in Gharaunda and Liberty Puram (Haryana) where its primary and the largest manufacturing units are situated, Paonta Sahib, (Himachal Pradesh) with two units and Roorkee (Uttarakhand).

See also
 MS Shoes
 Metro Shoes

References

 Liberty Shoes Google Finance
 Liberty Shoes Business Standard
 Liberty Shoes News and BSE, NSE listing at CNBC-TV18

External links
 Liberty Shoes Limited, Official website
 The Liberty Group, website
 Liberty Shoes at BSE Rediff Money
 Liberty Shoes Online Store

Clothing companies established in 1954
Companies based in Haryana
Companies listed on the Bombay Stock Exchange
Karnal
Companies listed on the National Stock Exchange of India
Shoe companies of India
Indian brands
Indian companies established in 1954
1954 establishments in East Punjab